Charles Hammond may refer to:

Charlie Hammond (1886–1936), Australian footballer
C. Herrick Hammond, American architect
Charles Hammond (English cricketer) (1818–1901), English cricketer
Charles Hammond (Australian cricketer) (1868-1955), Australian cricketer
Charles Hammond (lawyer and journalist) (1779-1840), American lawyer, journalist and politician